The Great Escape is a 1950 book by Australian writer Paul Brickhill that provides an insider's account of the 1944 mass escape from the German prisoner of war camp Stalag Luft III for British and Commonwealth airmen. As a prisoner in the camp, he participated in the escape plan but was debarred from the actual escape 'along with three or four others on grounds of claustrophobia'. The introduction to the book is written by George Harsh, an American POW at Stalag Luft III. This book was made into the 1963 film The Great Escape.

Summary 

The book covers the planning, execution and aftermath of what became known as The Great Escape. Other escape attempts (such as the Wooden Horse) are mentioned as well as the postwar hunt for the Gestapo agents who murdered fifty of the escapees on Hitler's direct order. The book was published in 1950. Brickhill, a journalist before and after the war, had previously written the story four different ways, initially as a BBC talk, then as newspaper and Reader's Digest articles, and in the 1946 book Escape to Danger which he co-wrote with Conrad Norton. By the time of the 1950 book, Brickhill had eliminated some of the less heroic aspects of the story, including the fact that a large proportion of the compound's population had no interest in the escape.

Much of the book is focused on Royal Air Force Squadron Leader Roger Bushell, also known as "Big X", including his capture, early escape attempts, and planning of the escape. All the major participants and their exploits are described by Brickhill. Among these are Tim Walenn, the principal forger, who 'gave his factory the code name of "Dean and Dawson", after a British travel agency'; Al Hake, the compass maker; Des Plunkett, the ingenious chief map tracer, who made a mimeograph for reproducing maps; and Tommy Guest, who ran a team of tailors. Major John Dodge, who was related by marriage to Winston Churchill, was one of the escapees. The German officers and guards (called 'goons' by the prisoners) included teams of 'ferrets' who crawled about under the raised huts looking for signs of tunnels. They were carefully watched by teams of POW 'stooges', one of whom was Paul Brickhill, 'boss of a gang of "stooges" guarding the forgers'.

In the end, seventy-six men escaped. Seventy-three were recaptured and fifty of those were shot by the Gestapo against the Geneva Convention which stated that POW's could not be killed for trying to escape. Four of the remaining twenty-three later tunnelled out of Sachsenhausen (a concentration camp), but were recaptured and chained to the floor of their cells. One of them, Major John Dodge, was released to secure a cease-fire. Three made it home safely.

The book is dedicated "to The Fifty".

In the aftermath of the escape, according to Brickhill, 5,000,000 Germans spent time looking for the prisoners, many of them full-time for weeks. According to Brickhill's biographer Stephen Dando-Collins, while this may have been an aspiration of the escapees, there is no foundation for such an exaggerated claim, which added to the story's heroic narrative.

The tunnels 
Three tunnels were dug for the escape. They were named Tom, Dick, and Harry. The operation was so secretive that everyone was to refer to each tunnel by its name. Bushell took this so seriously that he threatened to court-martial anyone who even uttered the word "tunnel" aloud. Tom was dug in hut 123 and extended west into the forest. Its length eventually reached 140 feet beyond the perimeter and the escapees were about to start digging vertically to the surface when it was found by the Germans and dynamited.

Dick was dug in the shower room of hut 122 and had the most secure trap door. It was to go in the same direction as Tom and the prisoners decided that the hut would not be a suspected tunnel site as it was further from the perimeter than the others. Dick was abandoned for escape purposes because the area where it would have surfaced was cleared for camp expansion. Dick was then used to store dirt, supplies, and as a workshop.

Harry, dug in hut 104, was the tunnel ultimately used for the escape. It was discovered as the escape was in progress with only seventy-six of the planned two hundred and twenty prisoners free. The Germans filled Harry with sewage and sand and sealed it off with cement. After the escape, the prisoners started digging another tunnel called George, but this was abandoned when the camp was evacuated.

After 'The Great Escape' 
On October 2, 2012, Penguin released Human Game: The True Story of the 'Great Escape' Murders and the Hunt for the Gestapo Gunmen by author and journalist Simon Read. The book details the 50 murders that took place following the escape and the three-year manhunt by the Royal Air Force to bring the killers to justice.

In other media
On January 27, 1951, NBC broadcast a live drama adaptation as an episode of The Philco Television Playhouse, starring E.G. Marshall, Everett Sloane, Horace Braham, and Kurt Katch. The live broadcast was praised for engineering an ingenious set design for the live broadcast, including creating the illusion of tunnels.

In 1963, the Mirisch brothers worked with United Artists to adapt the book to produce the film The Great Escape starring Steve McQueen, James Garner and Richard Attenborough. The film was based on the real events but depicts a heavily fictionalised version of the escape with numerous compromises for its commercial appeal, such as including three Americans among the escapees (in real life John Dodge was the only one). The characters are based on real men, and in some cases are composites of several men.

Other books on the escape incident from Stalag Luft III

References

Bibliography
 Brickhill, Paul. The Great Escape, CASSELL Publishing, 2009.
 Dando-Collins, Stephen. The Hero Maker: A Biography of Paul Brickhill. Sydney, Penguin Random House, 2016. .

1950 non-fiction books
World War II memoirs
Memoirs adapted into films
Prisoners of war in popular culture